Hyloxalus nexipus is a species of frog in the family Dendrobatidae. It is found on eastern slopes and foothills of the Andes from southeastern Ecuador south to the region of Yurimaguas in Peru.

Description
Hyloxalus nexipus males measure  and females  in snout–vent length. Dorsum is greenish black. Adult males have blacker throats than females. Juveniles have tiny white spots on the dorsum in the sacral region and on the legs. There is usually a dorsolateral as well as an oblique lateral stripe extending to eye.

Reproduction
Calling males have been observed during the daytime; one called from a stone at the edge of a river. The call consists of 20-29 notes, lasting 1–2 seconds. Females lay the eggs on land. Tadpoles are transported to streams by adults and develop in quiet pools in or adjacent to the watercourse.

Habitat and conservation
Its natural habitats are very humid to humid premontane forests and dry forest. It is mostly restricted to rocky stream habitats and waterfalls. It can also occur in modified and lightly degraded habitats, including rural gardens and cutover forest.

Hyloxalus nexipus is not rare where it occurs. It can be potentially threatened by collection for pet trade and habitat loss.

References

nexipus
Amphibians of Ecuador
Amphibians of Peru
Amphibians described in 1986
Taxonomy articles created by Polbot